The Higher Institute of Technology of Ivory Coast is a private institution of higher education and research whose headquarters is in the district of Plateau in Abidjan, the economic capital of Ivory Coast.

History

Created by a group of teachers-researchers, the Institut Supérieur de Technologie de Côte d'Ivoire is a university institution for scientific, cultural and professional character, enjoying corporate personality, pedagogical and scientific, administrative and financial autonomy.

It contributes to the missions of higher education and scientific research through five specialized higher schools.

The IST-CI is a member institution of the Network of Universities of Science and Technology of the Countries of Africa south of the Sahara.

Organization
The IST-CI has five specialized higher schools and one research centre:

Specialized higher schools
 Higher School of Management and Business Administration (ESMAE)
 Higher School of Communication (ESCOM)
 Higher School of Public Works, Mines and Geology (ESTPMG)
 Higher School of Industrial Technology (ESTI)
 Higher School of Applied Informatics (ESIA)

Research centre
 Consortium for the Management of Basic and Applied Research in Africa south of the Sahara

International relations
Since its inception, the IST-CI has worked to develop a network of international cooperation with foreign universities, including with the University of Poitiers.

External links 
 Official website

References 

Universities in Ivory Coast
Organizations based in Abidjan
Educational institutions established in 2007
2007 establishments in Ivory Coast
Buildings and structures in Abidjan